George Stetson was a schooner launched in 1880 and sunk in 1899.

Design 
The ship was designed by marine architect Albert Hathorn, who describes the design to be one of his best. The design employed with the Stetson served as the base for the larger 2,205 ton Parker M. Whitmore.

History 
The ship was built as a so-called 'Cape Horner' schooner for Parker Whitmore, launched in Bath, Maine in July 1880.

The entire crew was able to evacuate.

See also 
Grogan & Company (archived here) - The website hosts a painting of the George Stetson under sail

References 

Ships built in Bath, Maine
1880 ships